Team Performance Management is a quarterly peer-reviewed academic journal published by Emerald Group Publishing covering research on work-group and team performance management. The journal was established in 1995 and the editor-in-chief is  Petru Curseu (Tilburg University).

Abstracting and indexing 
The journal is abstracted and indexed in DIALOG, INSPEC, ProQuest databases, and Scopus.

External links 
 

Business and management journals
Quarterly journals
English-language journals
Publications established in 1995
Emerald Group Publishing academic journals